Frank Welch may refer to:
 Frank Welch (American politician) (1835–1878), Nebraska Republican politician
 Frank A. Welch (born 1959), Master Chief Petty Officer of the U.S. Coast Guard
 Frank Welch (baseball) (1897–1957), baseball player
 Frank Corbett Welch (1900–1986), Canadian exporter, farmer, horticulturist, and Senator

See also
 Fran Welch (1895–1970), athletics coach